Downtown Wilmington Commercial Historic District is a national historic district in Wilmington, New Castle County, Delaware. It encompasses 44 buildings in the city's downtown, most on North Market Street between 6th and 9th avenues. The district was the commercial center of the city between roughly 1870 and 1968, and contains an architecturally distinguished collection of late 19th- and early 20th-century architecture.  The Grand Opera House, built in 1871, is the oldest surviving building in the district.

The district was added to the National Register of Historic Places in 2017.

See also
National Register of Historic Places listings in Wilmington, Delaware

References

Historic districts in Wilmington, Delaware
Historic districts on the National Register of Historic Places in Delaware
National Register of Historic Places in Wilmington, Delaware